The Naval Hydrographic and Oceanographic Service ( or SHOM) is a French public establishment of an administrative nature administered by the Ministry of Defence.  It is the successor to the Dépôt des cartes et plans de la Marine, founded in 1720 which became the Naval Hydrographic Service in 1886 and the Naval and Oceanographic Service in 1971. Its present form was set up by decree number 2007-800 on 11 May 2007.  Its board is presided over by the Chief of Staff of the French Navy and the body is directed by a director-general.

Aims 

This public body has several aims, including the provision of :
 a public service in hydrography and maritime cartography, including the collection, elaboration, confirmation and spread of nautical information useful to civil or naval navigators and to all who sail for professional or pleasure, as well as those responsible for care of the coast
 to support the navy's hydrographers, oceanographers and meteorologists concerning specific information on maritime matters to ensure the optimal running of the navy's weapons systems (radar, sonar, infra-red sensors, carrier-borne aircraft etc.).

SHOM is made up of oceanographic and hydrographic groups, as well as a school, and employs 500 naval and civil personnel.  Its fleets consists of 5 boats: the Beautemps-Beaupré, the Borda, the La Pérouse, the Laplace and the Pourquoi-Pas ?.  SHOM works in cooperation with many other national organisations, including IFREMER (with whom it shares the Pourquoi-Pas ?), Météo-France, the CNRS, the University of Western Brittany and the IGN.

It participates in international hydrographic projects and programmes co-ordinated by the International Hydrographic Organization, of which France is a member.

Publications 
Among the SHOM's nautical publications are
maritime charts in paper or electronic form ("cartes électroniques de navigation" or ENC)
signal books, containing audio and visual signals for ship-to-ship and ship-to-shore use, as well as details of French lighthouses
Radio signal-books, for radio-electric navigation aids and radio-communications
nautical instructions and nautical instructions for those who sail for pleasure
tidal almanacks and atlas of currents
 Guides and works on navigation :
 navigator's guides
 a guide to the symbols and abbreviations on maritime charts (1D)
 International rules for preventing maritime accidents (Réglement international pour prévenir les abordages en mer, or RIPAM) (2A and 2B)
 Maritime signals (3C)
 the "Groupe d'avis aux navigateurs", a weekly bulletin with corrections to the above works
 the journal Annales hydrographiques

Directors

Notes

External links 
SHOM - official site

National hydrographic offices
Oceanographic organizations
Hydrographic
Maritime organizations